Henry III may refer to:

 Henry III, Holy Roman Emperor (1017–1056)
 King Henry III of Castile (1379–1406)
 King Henry III of England (1207–1272)
 King Henry III of France (1551–1589)
 King Henry III of Navarre (1553–1610), also King Henry IV of France
 Henry III, Prince of Anhalt-Aschersleben (died 1307)
 Henry III, Prince of Condé (1643–1709)
 Henry III, Duke of Bavaria (940–989)
 Henry III, Duke of Brabant (c. 1230–1261)
 Henry III, Duke of Brunswick-Grubenhagen (1416–1464)
 Henry III, Duke of Brunswick-Lüneburg (1533–1598)
 Henry III, Duke of Carinthia (1050–1122)
 Henry III, Duke of Głogów (died 1309/60–1309)
 Henry III, Duke of Limburg (1140s–1221)
 Henry III, Duke of Mecklenburg (c. 1337–1383)
 Henry III, Duke of Münsterberg-Oels (1542–1587)
 Henry III, Duke of Saxony (1129–1195)
 Henry III the White (1227–1266), Duke of Wrocław
 Henry III, Landgrave of Upper Hesse (1440–1483)
 Henry III, Margrave of Meissen (1215–1288)
 Henry III, Marquis of Namur (1216–1281)
 Henry III, Count of Bar (1259–1302)
 Henry III, Count of Champagne (1244–1274)
 Henry III, Count of Gorizia (1263–1323)
 Henry III, Count of Holstein-Rendsburg (died 1421)
 Henry III, Count of Louvain (died 1095)
 Henry III, Count of Luxembourg (died 1096)
 Henry III, Count of Sayn (died 1246)
 Henry III, Count of Schauenburg-Holstein (died 1421)
 Henry III of Nassau-Breda (1483–1538)
 Henry III, Lord of Waldeck (died 1267)